Gregory Gane Cornwell  (born 19 June 1938), former Australian politician, was a member of the unicameral Australian Capital Territory Legislative Assembly elected to the multi-member single constituency Assembly and later elected to represent the multi-member electorate of Molonglo for the Liberal Party.

Cornwell also served in the elected ACT House of Assembly (a predecessor to the ACT Legislative Assembly), representing the electoral district of Fraser, from 1975 until 1986 for the Liberal Party.

Cornwell was initially elected the second ACT Legislative Assembly in 1992, elected to represent Molonglo in the Assembly in 1995, 1998 and 2001 general elections. Cornwell did not contest the 2004 ACT general election. During the time when the government was led by his party, Cornwell served as Speaker of the Australian Capital Territory Legislative Assembly from 1995 to 2001.

References

Liberal Party of Australia members of the Australian Capital Territory Legislative Assembly
Members of the Australian Capital Territory Legislative Assembly
1938 births
Living people
Speakers of the Australian Capital Territory Legislative Assembly
Members of the Australian Capital Territory House of Assembly
Members of the Order of Australia
Recipients of the Centenary Medal
21st-century Australian politicians